Rhuddlan Town Football Club is a Welsh football club, playing in the North Wales Coast East Football League Premier Division.

The club was founded in October 1881 and the team plays its home matches at Pengwern College, Rhuddlan.

On the 28th June 2022 Rhuddlan Town announced the appointment of the new club Manager John 'Barney' Barnes, the club was only weeks away from folding, and with Barney looking for a management post after resigning from Prestatyn Town FC this was an appointment that was perfect for both parties.

Their home kit is grey shirt and navy shorts, their away kit is navy/blue shirts and navy shorts.

History and honours

League 
 Vale of Clwyd and Conwy Football League Premier Division
 Winners (1): 2019–20 
 Clwyd League 1st Division: Winners (3): 1995–96, 2000–01, 2011–12
 Clwyd League 2nd Division: Winners (2): 1986–87, 1994–95

 Cup 
 Presidents Cup: Winners (2): 2005–06, 2006–07
 Premier Cup: Runners up: 2006–07
 REM Jones Cup: Winners'''  2017–18

References

https://nwsport.co.uk/2022/06/28/rhuddlan-towns-new-manager-may-be-familiar-to-some-north-wales-football-followers/

External links 
 Facebook
 Twitter

Football clubs in Wales
1881 establishments in Wales
Rhuddlan
North Wales Coast Football League clubs
Vale of Clwyd and Conwy Football League clubs